As of the 2010 census, there are five United States congressional districts in Oklahoma. It was one of the states that was able to keep the same number of congressional districts from the previous census (in the past, Oklahoma has had as many as nine House of Representatives seats). Following the 2018 elections, a Democratic challenger ousted a Republican incumbent, changing the congressional delegation to a 4-1 Republican majority. The Republicans regained the seat in 2020 when Stephanie Bice defeated Horn. Along with Vermont & Delaware, Oklahoma has never gained a congressional seat.

Current districts and representatives
List of members of the United States House delegation from Oklahoma, their terms, their district boundaries, and the district political ratings according to the CPVI. The delegation has a total of 5 members, all 5 being members of the   Republican Party.

Historical and present district boundaries
Table of United States congressional district boundary maps in the State of Oklahoma, presented chronologically. All redistricting events that took place in Oklahoma between 1973 and 2013 are shown.

See also

 List of United States congressional districts
 Politics of Oklahoma
 Oklahoma Democratic Party
 Oklahoma Libertarian Party
 Oklahoma Republican Party

References

External links
 National Atlas of Oklahoma's Congressional Districts

Oklahoma Congressional Districts